Sven Johansson   (September 6, 1916 – July 11, 1987) born in Skärstad, was a Swedish politician. Elected in Jönköping County's constituency he was a member of the Centre Party, Johansson was a member of the second chamber of the Center Party from 1965 until 1982 when he became a member of the Christian Democrats.

References

This article was initially translated from the Swedish Wikipedia article.

Members of the Riksdag from the Centre Party (Sweden)
Members of the Riksdag from the Christian Democrats (Sweden)
1916 births
1987 deaths